Muradan Muthu is a 1964 Indian Tamil-language film, directed and produced by B. R. Panthulu. The film stars Sivaji Ganesan, Devika, M. V. Rajamma and Chandrakantha. It was released on 3 November 1964. The film was simultaneously shot in Kannada as Chinnada Gombe. This was the last collaboration between Panthulu and Ganesan.

Plot

Cast 
Sivaji Ganesan as Kalimuthu / Muthu
Devika as Seetha
B. R. Panthulu as Maruthamuthu
M. V. Rajamma as Maruthamuthu's wife
Chandrakantha as Muthu's sister
Prem Nazir as Chinna Zamindar
S. A. Ashokan as Periya Zamindar
V. K. Ramasamy as Chettiyar
Nagesh
A. Karunanidhi
C. K. Saraswathi as Seetha's stepmother
O. A. K. Thevar

Production 
The film was simultaneously shot in Kannada as Chinnada Gombe. This was the last collaboration between Panthulu and Ganesan. Puppetry in the film was performed by M. M. Roy.

Soundtrack 
Music was composed by T. G. Lingappa, while the lyrics were penned by Kannadasan.

Reception 
Dinakaran of the magazine Mutharam said the film, despite certain flaws, was watchable.

References

External links 
 

1960s Tamil-language films
1964 films
Films directed by B. R. Panthulu
Films scored by T. G. Lingappa
Tamil remakes of Kannada films